The 2009–10 EHF Women's Champions League was the 17th edition of the EHF Women's Champions League, a handball competition for top women's clubs of Europe managed by the European Handball Federation. It was won by Danish club Viborg HK who defeated Romanian CS Oltchim Râmnicu Vâlcea at the finals with an aggregate score of 60–52. It was the third title for Viborg and the sixth for a Danish team.

Place distribution 
A total of 30 teams participated in the 2009/10 Champions League, from 22 EHF federations. Each nation received a number of slots according to the 2008 ranking. The first 24 nations were allowed to participate in the tournament with their national champion (Iceland has not registered a team). The nations ranked 1 to 7 received an additional slot, as well as the defending champion's federation (Denmark).

Since Viborg HK, 2009 title holder, qualified through domestic league placement, the defending champion wild card was awarded to FCK Håndbold.

On 19 June 2009, Macedonian champion Kometal withdrew from the tournament due to economic problems. As a consequence, the EHF promoted French champion Metz from Qualification Tournament 2 to Group Matches, and Greek champion Ormi Patras from Qualification Tournament 1 to Qualification Tournament 2.

Teams 

th Title Holder

Round dates

Qualifying rounds 
The draw for both tournaments took place on 18 June 2009 in Vienna. The rights to organize and host the group matches were also decided in this draw.

Qualification Tournament 1 
Six teams were divided into two groups of three teams. Two losers of the Qualification Tournament 1 entered the EHF Cup at Round 2. The first and second placed team of each group advanced to the second Qualification Tournament. Group A was organized by Brühl in St. Gallen, Switzerland, while Group B was hosted by Milli Piyango in Ankara, Turkey.

Both Brühl and Milli Piyango won their respective hosted group. The two winners, along with second placed clubs Sassari and Amsterdam, played the Qualification Tournament 2. By finishing last, Vrnjačka Banja and Madeira failed to qualify for the next Champions League round, but advanced to the EHF Cup instead.

Group A

Group B

Qualification Tournament 2 
Sixteen teams were divided into four groups of four teams each. Twelve losers of the Qualification Tournament 2 entered the EHF Cup at Round 3. The first placed team of each group advanced to the Group Matches.

Byåsen, Zvezda, FCK Håndbold and Aalborg qualified by winning all three matches of their respective groups, with Aalborg being the only host to advance to the next stage. None of the four teams coming from the first qualification tournament won any points.

Group 1 
Hosted by SPR Lublin SSA in Lublin, Poland.

Group 2 
Hosted by SKP Bratislava in Partizánske, Slovakia.

Group 3 
Hosted by HC "Smart" in Uzhhorod, Ukraine.

Group 4 
Hosted by Aalborg DH in Aalborg, Denmark.

Group Matches 
Twelve teams, along with four winners of the qualifying rounds, competed in the group matches of the Champions League. There were four groups of four teams each. The first and second placed team of each group advanced to the Main Round. Third placed teams entered the Cup Winners' Cup in Round 4.

The draw for the round took place in Vienna on 24 June 2009 as part of a special event organized by the EHF, the Champions' Draw.

Group A

Group B

Group C

Group D

Main round 
The eight teams qualified from the Group Matches were drawn into two groups. Each group contained two winners and two second placed teams, in a way that clubs which had faced each other at Group Matches would not meet again in this round. The first and second placed teams of each group played in the semifinals.

The draw for the round took place in Linz, Austria on 19 January 2010.

Group 1

Group 2

Final round 
The semifinals and finals were played in two legs of home and away matches. Larvik and Oltchim had home court advantage for the second leg of the semifinals as winners of their respective groups.

After Viborg and Oltchim had secured their advance to the finals, the EHF announced that the home rights for those matches would be drawn on 20 April in Vienna. As a result of the draw, Viborg won home rights for the first leg and Oltchim for the second. To comply with EHF regulations about arenas' capacity, the matches were not played at the usual home ground of the clubs. The first leg took place on 8 May in Messecenter, Herning, while the second leg were played on 15 May at Sala Polivalentă, Bucharest.

Semifinals

Final

Top scorers 
As published by the EHF

Notes

References 

 
Women's EHF Champions League
EHF
EHF